Infiltration is a 2017 Canadian psychological thriller film directed by Robert Morin. It is about a plastic surgeon named Dr. Louis Richard, played by Christian Bégin, who treats a patient with a burn injury; the patient brings a lawsuit against him. The film premiered at the Fantasia International Film Festival, and was selected for a screening at the 2017 Vancouver International Film Festival. Principal photography took place over 17 days, wrapping up on 22 February 2016.

Reception
Radio-Canada critics commended the film for its atmosphere and intense direction, comparing it to the work of Michael Haneke and Roman Polanski. For La Presse, Marc-Andre Lussier awarded it four stars, hailing it as one of Morin's best films and for its atmosphere of anxiety. Le Devoirs Francois Levesque praised Morin as one of the best directors in the Cinema of Quebec and Infiltration as an "opus".

Accolades
Infiltration led in nominations at the Prix Iris, including with a nomination for Best Film.

References

External links
 

2017 films
2017 psychological thriller films
Canadian psychological thriller films
Films directed by Robert Morin
Films shot in Quebec
French-language Canadian films
2010s Canadian films